Mesopristes elongatus is a species of fish in the family Terapontidae known by the common name plain terapon. It is endemic to Madagascar, where it occurs in several rivers along the eastern coast. Its populations are thought to be decreasing due to habitat loss and degradation, which is accelerated by the siltation caused by deforestation.

This is a freshwater fish that sometimes enters estuaries. It is caught for food, and may be sold in local markets.

References

Mesopristes
Endemic fauna of Madagascar
Freshwater fish of Madagascar
Taxonomy articles created by Polbot
Fish described in 1866